Prechtel is a surname. Notable people with the surname include:

 Martín Prechtel, American author and educator
 Volker Prechtel (1941–1997), German actor